Hasiran (also Romanized as Ḩaşīrān) is a village in Bala Taleqan Rural District, in the Central District of Taleqan County, Alborz Province, Iran. At the 2006 census, its population was 19, in 7 families.

References 

Populated places in Taleqan County